Elections to Trafford Council were held on 7 May 1998. One-third of the council was up for election, with each successful candidate to serve a four-year term of office, expiring in 2002. The Labour Party held overall control of the council.

After the election, the composition of the council was as follows:

Summary

Ward results

References

1998 English local elections
1998
1990s in Greater Manchester